Sayuri Osuga (born 27 October 1980) is a Japanese speed skater and cyclist.  She is one of the few athletes who started both in the Winter Games 2002 and 2006 (in the 500 m speed skating event) and in the 2004 Summer Games (in the 500 m time trial cycling event, placing 10th).  Until 2006, she was a member of the professional Sankyoseiki speedskating team. She placed first and third in the Speedskating World Cup. She holds the Japanese records in the 500 m speed skating and the 500 m time trial event. From 2006 to 2011, she was sponsored by the construction company Daiwa House Industries Co. Ltd. She retired in 2011.

Speed skating results
2006
4th overall 500 m, World Cup
3rd 500 m, World Cup, 2 March
2nd 500 m, World Cup, 3 March
4th overall 100 m, World Cup
2nd 100 m, World Cup, 4 March
8th 500 m, 2006 Winter Olympics
2007
3rd 2 x 500 m, 2007 World Single Distance Speed Skating Championships

Cycling palmarès
2003
13th 500 m time trial, 2003 UCI Track Cycling World Championships

2004
10th 500 m time trial, 2004 Summer Olympics

External links

1980 births
Japanese female speed skaters
Japanese female cyclists
Speed skaters at the 2002 Winter Olympics
Speed skaters at the 2006 Winter Olympics
Olympic speed skaters of Japan
Cyclists at the 2004 Summer Olympics
Olympic cyclists of Japan
Speed skaters at the 1999 Asian Winter Games
Speed skaters at the 2003 Asian Winter Games
Speed skaters at the 2007 Asian Winter Games
Cyclists at the 2002 Asian Games
Medalists at the 2003 Asian Winter Games
Asian Games medalists in speed skating
Medalists at the 2002 Asian Games
Asian Games medalists in cycling
Asian Games silver medalists for Japan
Asian Games bronze medalists for Japan
Living people
World Single Distances Speed Skating Championships medalists
20th-century Japanese women
21st-century Japanese women